Tricholoma dermolomoides is an agaric fungus of the genus Tricholoma. Found in Peninsular Malaysia, growing on the soil around of an old termite mound, it was described as new to science in 1994 by English mycologist E.J.H. Corner.

See also
List of Tricholoma species

References

dermolomoides
Fungi described in 1994
Fungi of Asia
Taxa named by E. J. H. Corner